The Group of forces in battle with the counterrevolution in the South of Russia was a military formation of the Soviet Russian government created in the beginning of December 1917 to fight against various autonomous state formations (the Don Host Oblast and Ukrainian People's Republic) with a goal of establishing the Soviet government. 

The formation mainly consisted of Red Guard troops from Petrograd and Moscow under the command of Vladimir Antonov-Ovseenko and Mikhail Muravyov as the chief of staff. The group consisted of some 20,000 troops.

Historical background
The group started to arrive in Kharkiv on December 21, 1917, and on December 22-23, 1917, with the help of the local squads of Red Guards, it established Soviet power in the city. On December 24-25, 1917 in Kharkiv the First All-Ukrainian Congress of Soviets, which proclaimed the Ukrainian People's Republic of Soviets, took place. The group included the squads of Rudolf Sivers, Yuriy Sablin, Pavel Yegorov, Grigory Petrov, and others, as well as the local squads of Red Guards.

In the beginning of January 1918, without any official declaration of war, the group initiated military actions around Kharkiv (Lozova, Synelnykove, Pavlohrad, Sloviansk). By that time the Soviet government of Russia had concluded a provisional armistice agreement with the Central Powers, seeking to end its participation in World War I (see Treaty of Brest-Litovsk). On January 2, 1918 Sovnarkom appointed Sergo Ordzhonikidze the provisional extraordinary commissar of the Ukrainian region, who arrived in Kharkiv on January 8. In January 1918, under the pretense of helping the Bolsheviks of Ukraine in establishing Soviet power, the group launched an offensive from multiple directions (Kharkiv and Katerynoslav, Bryansk, Homel) against Kiev. A cover for military actions against the Ukrainian People's Republic was a call of the People's Secretariat to an armed struggle against the "counter-revolutionary" Central Council of Ukraine. The command of the offensive was handed to the acting People's Commissar Yuri Kotsiubynsky (acting for Vasyl Shakhrai). On February 8, 1918 the group occupied Kiev and the government of Ukraine relocated to Zhytomyr. On February 9, 1918 it signed a military protection pact with the Central Powers (see Treaty of Brest-Litovsk (Ukraine–Central Powers)).

In the east the group managed to occupy the Donets basin and the territory of the Don Host Oblast, ending the authority of General Alexey Kaledin. In the occupied territories such political formations as the Don Soviet Republic and the Donetsk-Krivoi Rog Soviet Republic were established.

Kiev Offensive

On January 15, 1918 the formation occupied Oleksandrivsk (Zaporizhia), and on January 21, 1918 Kharkiv received a message from Katerynoslav: "Pass this on to the Red Guard headquarters. We attacked Poltava ... the station is occupied, there is fighting in the city. Send urgently to Konstantinograd (Krasnohrad) 1000 Red Guards to connect with Yegorov". The Moscow Red Guard squads led by Yegorov, while traveling from the Lozova Rail Station, intercepted a heavy siege battery of the opponent that was sent to Poltava from Novocherkassk. At the same time Vladimir Antonov-Ovseenko reported to the Narkom of Military Affairs (Soviet Russia): "Yesterday in the evening Poltava was occupied by us through an offensive from Lozova and Kharkiv... [We are] anticipating a report about the occupation of Bakhmach".

On January 28 the 1st Minsk Revolutionary Troops, led by Reingold Berzin, occupied Bakhmach. Bērziņš's unit consisted of 3,500 Red Guards and soldiers, four artillery batteries, and an armored train (Putilov plant) with a team of 77 people and 16 machine guns. The same day, the revolutionary forces met some resistance at the Kruty Rail Station, where they were held off for another day by a few hundred cadets. Another commander of the Moscow Red Guards was Andrei Znamensky, who led the special assignment unit of Blagushe-Lefortovo.

At the Extraordinary All-Russian Railway Congress on January 26, 1918, Vladimir Lenin stated that the Rada was "living out its last days". On January 29 in Kiev an uprising of workers started at the Arsenal city factory. To their help rushed the squads of P. Yegorov, G. Kudinsky, Vitaliy Primakov, Reingold Berzin and others. In the fierce fighting on the outskirts of Kiev and in the city, artillery and armored trains were widely used. On February 6, 1918 the command of the Soviet forces reported back to Lenin in Petrograd that street fighting was taking place in Kiev and the Red Guards were suffering great losses. And it further stated: "We have cleared all the stations in Kiev, as well as the Rail Terminal. Armored trains of the latest technology are pushing out the enemy from the city center. Our artillery is shelling the city day and night. Request urgently that 1,000 Red Guards be sent." But no reinforcements were really needed, as the Ukrainian forces withdrew from the city. On February 8, 1918 Kiev finally became Soviet.

With the situation in Ukraine and the Lower Don river region secured, the group of forces was redirected to the South Ural region against General Alexander Dutov and then Józef Dowbor-Muśnicki in the eastern regions of Belarus.

Order of battle

Commanders
 Vladimir Antonov-Ovseenko
 Mikhail Artemyevich Muravyov, chief of staff
 Sergo Ordzhonikidze, special commissar to Ukraine and the Southern region

Initial composition
 Finish Infantry Regiment (Northern Flying Group), ~1,300 soldiers, 6 artillery guns, 3 armored cars, 9 motorcycles, Rudolf Sivers (fought mainly in East Ukraine and Don region)
 1st Petrograd [Free] Red Guards, 300 soldiers, Nikolai Khovrin (fell apart and dissolved after arrival in Ukraine)
 Moscow Combined Group of revolutionary soldiers, Yuriy Sablin
 Zaitsev Armoured train
 1st Moscow Revolutionary Red Guards (Moskva River neighborhood), Captain Pavel Yegorov
 1st Minsk Revolutionary Troops, V.Prolygin, Reingold Berzin (Konstantin Volobuyev)
 Black Sea Fleet sailors, Andrei Polupanov
 Blagushe-Lefortovo Red Guards
 Bryansk Red Guards
 3rd Bryansk artillery battery
 Putilov Factory Red Guards
 Petrograd Red Guards (Moscow district)
 11th Siberian Regiment

Later additions
 Kharkiv Red Guards (Aleksandr Belenkovich)
 a few soldiers of the 2nd Ukrainian Reserve Regiment
 Red Cossacks (Vitaly Markovich Primakov)
 Donbas Red Guards (Dmitry Zhloba)
 30th Reserve Regiment (Nikolai Rudnev)
 Kharkiv Red Guards
 VEK Factory Red Guards
 Dynamo Factory Red Guards
 Synelnykove Red Guards
 Bryansk Factory Red Guards
 Orlyk Serdiuk Regiment
 Anarchists of Maria Nikiforova and Nestor Makhno
 Oleksandrivsk Red Guards
 Kiev city garrison soldiers (Shevchenko, Sahaidachny, Khmelnytsky regiments)
 Arsenal Factory Red Guards
 Matisson Factory [Podil] Red Guards
 Demiyivka Red Guards
 Shuliavka Red Guards
 Kiev Locomotive Depot Red Guards

Further reading

 Antonov-Ovseenko, V. Notes about the civil war. Moscow 1924.
 Khrystiuk, P. Notes and materials to the history of the Ukrainian revolution 1917-1920. Vienna 1921.
 Doroshenko, D. History of Ukraine: 1917-1923. Uzhhorod 1932.
 Civil War in the USSR. Moscow 1980.
 Ukrainian Central Council. Documents and materials. Kiev 1997.

External links
 Group of forces in battle with the counterrevolution in the South of Russia. Encyclopedia on the History of Ukraine.
 Red Guards on the defense of October - Destruction of counter-revolutionary uprisings in the south of the country. 
 Kalinichenko, V. History of Ukraine: Part III 1917-2003. Textbook for the history departments of higher educational institutions. "Kharkiv National University of Karazin". Kharkiv 2004.

Soviet units and formations of the Russian Civil War
Military units and formations established in 1917
Ukrainian–Soviet War
Red Guards (Russia)